The I'Anson Baronetcy of Bassetbury was a title in the Baronetage of England. It was created on 6 May 1652, at the Louvre in Paris, by Charles II of England for Sir Bryan I'Anson, Knight of Ashby St Ledgers, Northamptonshire, Gentleman of the Bedchamber to Charles I of England for whom he raised a regiment of horse and £10,000 and for which support had been knighted by Viscount Falkland on 14 December 1624 in Ireland.  The baronetcy became extinct on the death of the seventh Baronet in 1800.

I'Anson Baronets of Bassetbury (1652)
Sir Bryan I'Anson, 1st Baronet ( – c. 1665), Gentleman of the Bedchamber to Charles I
Sir Henry I'Anson, 2nd Baronet (c. 1617  – c. 1684) LL.D, physician to Charles II of England
Sir Thomas I'Anson, 3rd Baronet (c. 1648–1707) M.A., born at the Louvre Palace
Sir Thomas Bankes I'Anson, 4th Baronet (c. 1701–1764), Gentleman Porter of the Tower of London
Sir Thomas Bankes I'Anson, 5th Baronet (1724–1799), LL.B, born Languedoc, rector of Corfe Castle, Dorset
Sir John Bankes I'Anson, 6th Baronet (1759–1799), rector of Corfe Castle, Dorset
Sir John I'Anson, 7th Baronet (1733–1800), of New Bounds, Kent, brother-in-law of Earl James Annesley

References

Extinct baronetcies in the Baronetage of England